The Indian 2-rupee coin is a denomination of the Indian rupee. The 2 rupee coin was introduced in India in 1982.  Until then, the Rs.2 was in circulation in banknotes. The old Rs.2 coin was minted with cupro-nickel metal. The new Rs.2 coin was minted in ferritic stainless steel.

Old Rs.2 
 The old Rs.2 coin was of 26mm diameter.
 The weight of the coin is 6 grams.
 The shape is eleven-sided (hendecagonal) or cornered.

Rs.2 coin (no rupee sign) 
 The Rs.2 coin (no rupee sign) is of 27mm diameter.
 The weight of the coin is 5.62 grams.
 The shape is circular.

Rs.2 coin (new rupee sign) 
 The Rs.2 coin (new rupee sign) is of 25mm diameter.
 The weight of the coin is 4.5 grams.
 The shape is circular.

See also
Indian 2-rupee note

References

Coins of India
Rupee
Two-base-unit coins
Currencies introduced in 1982